Khanqah-e-Mualla Noorbakshia Khaplu Bala is the largest Khanqah built by mud and wood in the region of Gilgit Baltistan. It is located in Khaplu and was built by Mir Mukhtar Akhyar, a Sufi master of Nurbakshi Order around 400 years ago. It is one of the oldest mosques in the Baltistan region, and is one of the areas most famous landmarks and a major tourist attraction.

See also 
 Khaplu Palace
 Chaqchan Mosque
 Khaplu

References 

Buildings and structures in Gilgit-Baltistan
Tibetan architecture
History of Baltistan
Mosques in Gilgit-Baltistan
Ghanche District